Ionolyce helicon, the pointed lineblue, or bronze lineblue, is a small butterfly found in the Indomalayan realm that belongs to the lycaenids or blues family.

Description
Dorsal surface of male dark purple and without markings. Whereas in female, dorsum brownish with a bluish-purple tinge at the wing bases. Ventral surface of both wings with dull greyish-brown and white striae. Eye spot at tornus tipped with orange ring. There is a fine white-tipped tail. Caterpillar greenish with pale green markings. Host plants are Allophylus cobbe and Entada phaseoloides. Pupa mottled brown with dark markings.

Subspecies
There are eight subspecies including nominate race.

 Ionolyce helicon brunnea (Evans, 1932) - Andaman & Nicobar Is. (Andamans).
 Ionolyce helicon caracalla (Waterhouse & Lyell, 1914) - Waigeu, Misool, West Irian - Papua, Darnley I., New Britain, New Ireland
 Ionolyce helicon helicon Felder, 1860
 Ionolyce helicon hyllus (Waterhouse & Lyell, 1914) -Australia (Cape York - Cooktown)
 Ionolyce helicon javanica Toxopeus, 1929 - Java
 Ionolyce helicon kondulana (Evans, 1932) - Andaman & Nicobar Is. (South Nicobars).
 Ionolyce helicon merguiana Moore, 1884 - Sikkim to N.E. India, S.Burma, Thailand - Singapore, Sumatra, ?Borneo, S.Yunnan
 Ionolyce helicon viola (Moore, 1877) - Sri Lanka, south India

References

Butterflies of Asia
Butterflies of Sri Lanka
Butterflies described in 1860
Polyommatini
Fauna of Pakistan